"Breathe Me" is a 2004 single by Australian singer Sia featured on the album Colour the Small One. The single has sold over 1.2 million copies in the United States. The song became popular on alternative radio and has been used in many different forms of media.

Critical reception
Rolling Stone called the song "delicate and haunting". The song has received increasingly positive reviews in years since its release, being described as "beautiful and moving."

Chart performance
In the United Kingdom, "Breathe Me" peaked at number 71 on 1 May 2004. The single also reached number 19 in Denmark in 2011 and number 81 in France in 2012. In the United States, the track charted at number 24 on the Rock Digital Songs, a component chart on the Billboard magazine.

Music video
The official music video was directed by Daniel Askill. It was shot over three days in a themed hotel in London and it is constructed with over 2,500 individual polaroid stills.

Track listings

Maxi CD Pt.1
"Breathe Me" – 4:32
"Sea Shells" – 4:52

Maxi CD Pt.2
"Breathe Me" – 4:34
"Breathe Me (Four Tet remix)" – 5:01
"Breathe Me (Ulrich Schnauss remix)" – 4:57
"Breathe Me (Mylo remix)" – 6:22
"Breathe Me (Mr. Dan remix)" – 4:38

10" Pt.1
A: "Breathe Me (Four Tet remix)" – 5:01
B: "Where I Belong (Hot Chip remix)" – 5:03

10" Pt.2
A: "Breathe Me (Ulrich Schnauss remix)" – 4:57
B: "Numb (Leila remix)" – 4:14

12" Single
A1 "Breathe Me (Mylo remix)" – 6:22
A2 "Breathe Me (Ulrich Schnauss remix)" – 4:57
B1 "Breathe Me (Four Tet remix)" – 5:01
B2 "Breathe Me (Mr. Dan remix)" – 4:38

Charts and certifications

Charts

Certifications

Release history

References 

2004 singles
Sia (musician) songs
Songs written by Sia (musician)
Pop ballads
2004 songs
Songs written by Dan Carey (record producer)
Astralwerks singles
Go! Beat singles
2000s ballads
Music videos directed by Daniel Askill